GVT TV was an operator of pay television via satellite and subsidiary from Global Village Telecom, where its signal transmission is made of DTH (direct to home) system for Ku band. It was founded on September 16, 2011, in beta version. GVT TV was created with the intention to fight for paid TV leadership with big operators from Brazil such as Sky Brazil and Via Embratel, which use the same technology.

References

External links 
Página oficial da GVT TV  (In Portuguese)
Channel and transponder list

Television companies of Brazil
Satellite television